The Fushan Botanical Garden is a botanical garden in Yuanshan Township, Yilan County and Wulai District, New Taipei in Taiwan. It is managed by Taiwan Forestry Research Institute.

History
The area used to be inhabited by the Atayal people.

Geology
Covering an area of 410 hectares, it is the largest botanical garden in Taiwan. It stands on an elevation of 600–1,400 meters above sea level. It has an annual average temperature of 18.5°C and rainfall of 4,125 mm. It consists of more than 700 species of plants.

Facilities
The botanical garden features a nature center which displays the information regarding the garden. It has a 20 km-long walking path for visitors to explore the garden.

See also
 List of parks in Taiwan

References

External links

 

Botanical gardens in Taiwan
Landforms of New Taipei
Landforms of Yilan County, Taiwan
Tourist attractions in New Taipei
Tourist attractions in Yilan County, Taiwan
Wulai District